Omar Hayat Malik was a Pakistani politician, educationist and diplomat. 

In British India, Malik served as the principal of the Islamia College, Peshawar and Islamia College, Lahore. A participant in the Pakistan Movement, he was elected to the Constituent Assembly of India as a candidate of Muslim League and abdicated attendance until the Mountbatten Plan sanctioned the creation of Pakistan and its own constituent assembly. A gifted orator, Malik wished for the new state to be a theocratic democracy. 

In independent Pakistan, Malik was appointed as the first vice-chancellor of the University of the Punjab. However, he resigned in 1950 and joined the diplomatic corps; Malik would serve as Pakistan's ambassador to Japan, Germany, Indonesia and as High Commissioner to India.

Notes

References 

Vice-Chancellors of the University of the Punjab
Year of birth missing
Pakistan Movement activists
Ambassadors of Pakistan to Germany
Ambassadors of Pakistan to Indonesia
Ambassadors of Pakistan to Japan
High Commissioners of Pakistan to India
Members of the Constituent Assembly of Pakistan